Shayne Ward is the debut studio album by English singer Shayne Ward. The release of the album came five months after he won the second series of the British talent show The X Factor, with the recording process taking place between 2005 and 2006.

Background and release
The album was released on 17 April 2006 and debuted at number one on both the Irish Albums Chart and the UK Albums Chart. Since its release, the album has been certified Platinum in the UK, selling 538,918 copies as of November 2015. Worldwide, the album has sold over 1,120,000 copies. The album spawned the singles "That's My Goal", "No Promises" and "Stand by Me". The album was later re-released on 18 December 2006, with the addition of a bonus DVD. The album was not issued in Japan until 2007, and the lead single in the region consisted of a double A-side of "That's My Goal" and "No Promises". A new video for "That's My Goal" was filmed for the release.

In November 2022, the album was released on vinyl record for the first time.

Track listing

Charts and certifications

Weekly charts

Year-end charts

Certifications

References

Shayne Ward albums
2006 debut albums
Syco Music albums
Albums produced by Cutfather